Trivoli Township may refer to the following townships in the United States:

 Trivoli Township, Peoria County, Illinois
 Trivoli Township, Ellsworth County, Kansas